The N-230 connects Lleida to Vielha, the Vall d'Aran and France.

It passes through Benabarre, the Vall del Noguera Ribagorçana and the Vielha tunnel (5.240m). The road is to be up-graded to the Autovía A-14.

See also
Autovía A-138

Roads in Catalonia
Transport in Aragon
National roads in Spain